was a junior college in Chikusa-ku Nagoya Aichi Prefecture, Japan, and was part of the Sugiyama Jogakuen network.

 The Junior College was founded in 1969 as an attached to Sugiyama Jogakuen University.
 There were two courses in this Junior College, the students ware major in Japanese literature or English literature.
 Some students included in Sugiyama Jogakuen University, Aichi University, Ritsumeikan University and others after graduation.
 In 2001 the Junior College was closed.

Universities and colleges in Nagoya
Educational institutions established in 1969
Japanese junior colleges
Private universities and colleges in Japan
1969 establishments in Japan
Educational institutions disestablished in 2001
2001 disestablishments in Japan